
Year 855 (DCCCLV) was a common year starting on Tuesday (link will display the full calendar) of the Julian calendar.

Events 
 By place 

 Byzantine Empire 
 November 20 – Theoktistos, co-regent of the Empire on behalf of 15-year old Emperor Michael III, is murdered on the orders of Michael.
 
 Central Europe 
 September 29 – Emperor Lothair I dies after a 15-year reign (co-ruling with his father Louis the Pious until 840). He divides the Middle Frankish Kingdom between his three sons in an agreement called the Treaty of Prüm—the eldest, Louis II, receives the northern half of Italy and the title of Holy Roman Emperor. The second, Lothair II, receives Lotharingia (the Low Countries and Upper Burgundy). The youngest, Charles, receives Lower Burgundy and Provence. 

 Britain 
 Spring – King Æthelwulf of Wessex decides to go on a pilgrimage to Rome, accompanied by his youngest son Alfred (age 6) and a large retinue. He divides the kingdom between his two eldest sons; Æthelbald receives the western part of Wessex, while Æthelberht becomes ruler over Kent, Surrey, Sussex and Essex.

 Abbasid Caliphate 
 Caliph al-Mutawakkil sends an Abbasid army, led by the Turkic general Bugha al-Kabir, to suppress an uprising of rebellious Armenian nakharars. He subdues the country, and deports many Armenian nobles to the caliphal capital of Samarra.

 By topic 
 Religion 
 July 17 – Pope Leo IV dies after an 8-year reign, and is succeeded by Benedict III as the 104th pope of Rome. Anastasius is made anti-pope by Lothair I.
 Æthelwulf grants churches in Wessex the right to receive tithes. He gives one-tenth of his lands to the Church.
 The Slavic alphabet is created by Saints Cyril and Methodius.

Births 
 Abu'l-Hasan Ali ibn al-Furat, Muslim vizier (d. 924)
 Gerald of Aurillac, Frankish nobleman (approximate date)
 Guaimar I of Salerno, Lombard prince (approximate date)
 Han Jian, Chinese warlord (d. 912)
 Jing Hao, Chinese painter (d. 915)

Deaths 
 July 17 – Leo IV, pope of the Catholic Church (b. 790)
 September 20 – Gozbald, abbot and bishop of Würzburg
 September 29 – Lothair I, Frankish king and emperor (b. 795)
 November 20 – Theoktistos, Byzantine chief minister
 December 8 – Drogo of Metz, illegitimate son of Charlemagne (b. 801)
 Ahmad ibn Hanbal, Muslim scholar and theologian (b. 780)
 Boso the Elder, count of Turin and Valois
 Cyngen ap Cadell, king of Powys (Wales)
 Elisedd ap Cyngen, king of Powys (Wales)
 Pepin, count of Vermandois (approximate date)
 Sahnun ibn Sa'id, Muslim jurist (or 854)
 Sico II, prince of Salerno (Italy)

References

Sources